Nadezhdino is a rural locality (a selo) in Aksakovsky Selsoviet, Belebeyevsky District, Bashkortostan, Russia. The population was 701 as of 2010. There are 11 streets.

Geography 
Nadezhdino is located 10 km southeast of Belebey (the district's administrative centre) by road. Aksakovo is the nearest rural locality.

References 

Rural localities in Belebeyevsky District